The white-throated mountain babbler (Turdoides gilberti) is a passerine bird in the family Leiothrichidae.
It is found in Cameroon and Nigeria. 
Its natural habitat is subtropical or tropical moist montane forests.
It is threatened by habitat loss.

The white-throated mountain babbler was moved from the genus Kupeornis to Turdoides based on the results of a molecular phylogenetic study published in 2018.

References

Collar, N. J. & Robson, C. 2007. Family Timaliidae (Babblers)  pp. 70 – 291 in; del Hoyo, J., Elliott, A. & Christie, D.A. eds. Handbook of the Birds of the World, Vol. 12. Picathartes to Tits and Chickadees. Lynx Edicions, Barcelona.

white-throated mountain babbler
Birds of Central Africa
white-throated mountain babbler
Taxonomy articles created by Polbot
Fauna of the Cameroonian Highlands forests
Taxobox binomials not recognized by IUCN